Renee Luers-Gillispie is an American college softball coach and a former college player. Luers-Gillispie is currently the head coach of the Iowa Hawkeyes softball team of the University of Iowa.

Playing career
Luers-Gillispie first attended Kirkwood Community College in Cedar Rapids, Iowa, where she played for the softball team in 1981. After her freshman year, she transferred to West Texas A&M in Canyon, Texas, where she was a three-year starter. As a player, she set nine career pitching records including most wins, most strikeouts and most saves at West Texas A&M.

In 2005, Luers-Gillispie was inducted into the West Texas A&M Athletics Hall of Fame.

Coaching career
Luers-Gillispie began her coaching career at Joliet Junior College in 1991. She became the head coach at Bradley University in 1993, and was named to the same position at Texas Tech in 1996.

In 2000, Luers-Gillispie was hired by UCF to start the Knights softball program. The UCF softball team began play in 2002. The Knights played their first games on February 2, losing the first contest 2–3 to Bethune–Cookman, and winning their second game against Arkansas, 6–5. In 2005 and 2008, Luers-Gillispie led the Knights to conference tournament championships, and the program has appeared in the NCAA Tournament five times, in 2005, 2008, 2010, 2012, and 2014.

Personal life
Gillispie and her husband, Mark, were married in 1983 and currently reside in Iowa City, Iowa.

Head coaching record

College

References

External links
 – Official biography at UCFAthletics.com.

Living people
Year of birth missing (living people)
Female sports coaches
American softball coaches
UCF Knights softball coaches
Texas Tech Red Raiders softball coaches
Bradley Braves softball coaches
Joliet Wolves softball coaches
People from Livermore, California
People from Oviedo, Florida
Iowa Hawkeyes softball coaches